Goodenia rotundifolia is a species of flowering plant in the family Goodeniaceae and is endemic to eastern Australia. It is a prostrate to erect perennial herb with more or less round, toothed leaves and racemes of yellow flowers.

Description
Flowering mainly occurs from September to May and the fruit is a more or less spherical capsule  in diameter.

Taxonomy and naming
Goodenia rotundifolia was first formally described in 1810 by Robert Brown in his Prodromus Florae Novae Hollandiae et Insulae Van Diemen. The specific epithet (rotundifolia) means "circular-leaved".

Distribution and habitat
This goodenia grows in woodland and forest on the coast and tablelands from southern Queensland to the Hunter Valley in New South Wales.

References

rotundifolia
Flora of New South Wales
Flora of Queensland
Plants described in 1810
Taxa named by Robert Brown (botanist, born 1773)
Endemic flora of Australia